This is a list of Romanian singers. The list includes both people known in Romania as singers, and singers from other countries who have Romanian ancestry.

3

3rei Sud Est

A
Anda Adam
Olivia Addams
Adena
Alexandru Agache
Akcent
Alessia
Nicoleta Alexandru
Radu Almășan
AMI
Andra
Aurelian Andreescu
Theodor Andrei
Luminiţa Anghel
Monica Anghel
Giulia Anghelescu
Animal X
Ovidiu Anton
Kristaq Antoniu

B

Ilinca Băcilă
Andreea Bălan
Andreea Bănică
Ștefan Bănică, Jr.
Ștefan Bănică, Sr.
Ştefan de la Bărbuleşti
Agatha Bârsescu
Doina Badea
Ramona Badescu
Mircea Baniciu
Bere Gratis
Ducu Bertzi
Victoria Bezetti
Veta Biriș
Dan Bittman
Blaxy Girls
Florin Bogardo
Anda-Louise Bogza
Dan Bordeianu
Horia Brenciu
Marius Brenciu
Nicolae Bretan
Roxana Briban
Costel Busuioc
Maria Butaciu

C

Carla's Dreams
Cornelia Catangă
Maria Cebotari
Ovidiu Cernăuţeanu
Elena Cernei
Cezar
The Cheeky Girls
Nicole Cherry
Florin Chilian
Corina Chiriac
Tudor Chirilă
Maria Ciobanu
Sandu Ciorba
Sabina Cojocar
Sorin Coliban
Connect-R
Corina
Mioara Cortez
Viorica Cortez
Zeno Coste
Ileana Cotrubaş
Michael Cretu
Bogdan Curta

D

Ion Dacian
Elena Dan
Hariclea Darclée
Annamari Dancs
Diana V
Gil Dobrică
Ion Dolănescu
Ruxandra Donose
Dida Drăgan

E

Emaa
Noni Răzvan Ene
Alina Eremia

F

Felicia Filip
Sonny Flame
Alex Florea
Mircea Florian
Răzvan Fodor
Killa Fonic
Maria Forescu

G

G Girls
Elena Gaja
Andrei Găluț
Geneva
Kamara Ghedi
Elena Gheorghe
Tudor Gheorghe
Angela Gheorghiu
Maria Gheorghiu
Teodora Gheorghiu
Christina Grimmie
Loredana Groza
Traian Grozăvescu
Nicolae Guță

H

Hara
Haiducii
Anita Hartig
Rona Hartner
Pompeiu Hărășteanu
Heaven
Nicolae Herlea
Hi-Q
Ioan Holender
Hotel FM
Holy Molly
Károly Horváth
Alexandrina Hristov
Ștefan Hrușcă
The Humans

I

Antonia Iacobescu
Narcis Iustin Ianău
Magda Ianculescu
Ioana Ignat
Teodor Ilincăi
Emeric Imre
Indiggo
Inna
Costi Ioniță
Cristina Iordachescu
Dan Iordăchescu
Irina Iordachescu
Leo Iorga
Adrian Ivaniţchi
Stana Izbaşa

J

Vika Jigulina

K

Kamelia
Atilla Kiss B.
Dalma Kovács
Marina Krilovici

L

Sanda Ladoşi
Lala Band
Nicolae Leonard
Anna Lesko
Irina Loghin
Lora
Gabi Luncă

M

Mandinga
Mădălina Manole
Yolanda Marculescu
Radu Marian
Vasile Martinoiu
Delia Matache
Edward Maya
Julie Mayaya
Alexandra Irina Măruță
Alex Mica
Ioan Luchian Mihalea
Ada Milea
Minelli
Adrian Minune
Nelly Miricioiu
Vlad Miriţă
Dani Mocanu
Marius Moga
Angela Moldovan
Vasile Moldoveanu
Morandi
Jean Moscopol
Elena Moșuc
The Motans
Petre Munteanu
Silvia Sorina Munteanu

N

Dana Nălbaru
Naomy
Ramona Nerra
Nico
Mariana Nicolesco
George Nicolescu
Kadriye Nurmambet

O

Mălina Olinescu

P

George Papagheorghe
Parazitii
Anca Parghel
Cristina Pasaroiu
Ioan Gyuri Pascu
Margareta Pâslaru
Claudia Pavel
Marcel Pavel
Ester Peony
George Petean
Gică Petrescu
Florian Pittiș
Nelu Ploieșteanu
Claudia Pop
Ștefan Pop
Adela Popescu
Valeria Peter Predescu
Romica Puceanu

R

Irina Rimes
Florin Ristei
Stella Roman
Roxen
Mihaela Runceanu
Florian Rus

S

Florin Salam
Bella Santiago
Ileana Sărăroiu
Teodora Sava
Joseph Schmidt
Vasile Șeicaru
Paula Seling
Carmen Şerban
Angela Similea
Dona Dumitru Siminică
Adrian Sînă
Smiley
Victor Socaciu
Sorana
Alina Sorescu
Dan Spătaru
Spitalul de Urgență
Alexandra Stan
Tatiana Stepa
Ștefan de la Bărbulești
Laura Stoica
Georgeta Stoleriu
Cleopatra Stratan

T

Tataee
Maria Tănase
Taxi
Elena Theodorini
Todomondo
Mihai Traistariu
Eduard Tumagian
Aura Twarowska

U

Tzancă Uraganu
Viorica Ursuleac
Aura Urziceanu

V

Leontina Vaduva
Cristian Vasile
Veronika
Sofia Vicoveanca
Vali Vijelie
Nadine Voindrouh
Voltaj

W

Wrs
Ellie White

X

Xonia

Z

Adela Zaharia
Zavaidoc
Virginia Zeani

See also
Music of Romania

Romanian singers
 
Romanian